Josh Keyes  (born January 23, 1993) is a former American football linebacker. He played college football at Boston College.

Professional career

Tampa Bay Buccaneers
Keyes was signed as an undrafted rookie on May 5, 2015. On September 5, 2015, he was waived. On September 7, 2015, Keyes was signed to the practice squad. On September 24, 2015, he was released from the practice squad.

Kansas City Chiefs
On October 20, 2015, Keyes was signed to the Chiefs' practice squad. On November 3, 2015, he was released by the team.

Tampa Bay Buccaneers (second stint)
On November 18, Keyes returned to the Buccaneers and was re-signed to their practice squad. Three days later, on November 21, Keyes was promoted to the Buccaneers' active roster. On September 3, 2016 Keyes was released by the Buccaneers as part of final roster cuts. The next day, he was signed to the Buccaneers' practice squad. On September 10, 2016, Keyes was promoted to the Buccaneers' active roster. He was released on September 21, 2016. He was re-signed on September 23, 2016, after Devante Bond was placed on injured reserve. He was released again on October 3, 2016, and re-signed to the practice squad two days later. He was released on October 11, 2016.

Atlanta Falcons
On October 19, 2016, Keyes was signed to the Falcons' practice squad. He was promoted to the active roster on December 22, 2016. Keyes was inactive for the Falcons' 34-28 overtime loss to the New England Patriots in the Super Bowl.

On September 2, 2017, Keyes was waived/injured by the Falcons and placed on injured reserve. He was released on September 11, 2017.

Los Angeles Chargers
On October 16, 2017, Keyes signed with the Los Angeles Chargers. He was waived on November 7, 2017.

Cleveland Browns
On November 8, 2017, Keyes was claimed off waivers by the Cleveland Browns.

Houston Texans
On March 20, 2018, Keyes signed with the Houston Texans. He was waived on September 1, 2018.

Washington Redskins
Keyes signed with the Washington Redskins on September 5, 2018, but was waived on September 11.

Houston Texans (second stint)
On October 22, 2018, Keyes was signed by the Houston Texans. He was waived on November 27, 2018. He was re-signed on December 27, 2018.

References

External links
Tampa Bay Buccaneers bio

1993 births
Living people
People from Ghent, New York
Players of American football from New York (state)
American football linebackers
Boston College Eagles football players
Tampa Bay Buccaneers players
Kansas City Chiefs players
Atlanta Falcons players
Los Angeles Chargers players
Cleveland Browns players
Houston Texans players
Washington Redskins players